No Turning Back is the third album from Christian R&B/urban-pop group Out of Eden. It was released in 1999 by Gotee Records.

Track listing 
 Lookin' For Love
 River
 Spirit Moves
 Here's My Heart (feat. The Katinas)
 Window
 If You Really Knew
 Tomorrow
 Open Up Your Heart
 Draw You Near
 No Turning Back
 Sarah Jane

Charts

References 

1999 albums
Out of Eden albums
Gotee Records albums